Prince Moulay Abdallah of Morocco, KCVO, (30 July 1935 – 20 December 1983) was the brother of Moulay Hassan, later King Hassan II of Morocco and the son of King Mohammed V of Morocco (1909–1961) and his second wife, Lalla Abla bint Tahar (1909–1992).

Family
On 9 November 1961, he married Lamia Solh, the daughter of Riad Solh, the first Prime Minister of Lebanon. He is the father of Prince Moulay Hicham, Princess Lalla Zineb and Prince Moulay Ismail who are cousins of Prince Al Waleed bin Talal Al Saud of Saudi Arabia.

Death
He died of cancer on 20 December 1983, aged 48, in Rabat.

Legacy
Prince Moulay Abdellah Stadium is named after him.

Honours

National honours 
 Knight Grand Cordon of the Order of the Throne (1963).

Foreign honours 
  : Knight Grand Cross of the Legion of Honour (1963). 
  Empire of Iran : Commemorative Medal of the 2500th Anniversary of the founding of the Persian Empire (14/10/1971).
  : Knight Commander of the Royal Victorian Order (27/10/1980).

References 

Moroccan royalty
People from Rabat
1935 births
1983 deaths
Deaths from cancer in Morocco
Abdellah
Knights Commander of the Royal Victorian Order
Grand Croix of the Légion d'honneur
Moroccan exiles in Madagascar
Sons of kings